The 51st Tour of Flanders cycling classic was held on Sunday, 2 April 1967. The race was won by Italian rider Dino Zandegù in a two-man sprint with Noël Foré. Eddy Merckx won the sprint for third place. 92 of 139 riders finished.

Route
The race started in Ghent and finished in Gentbrugge – covering 245 km. The Kwaremont was re-included after the road works had suppressed it the previous years. There were four categorized climbs:
 Kwaremont
 Kloosterstraat (Geraardsbergen)
 Valkenberg
 Kasteelstraat

Results

References

External links
 Video of the 1967 Tour of Flanders  on Sporza (in Dutch)

Tour of Flanders
1967 in road cycling
1967 in Belgian sport
1967 Super Prestige Pernod